The 2020–21 FC Zenit Saint Petersburg season was the club's 96th season in existence and the 25th consecutive season in the top flight of Russian football. In addition to the domestic league, Zenit Saint Petersburg participated in this season's editions of the Russian Cup and UEFA Champions League. The season covers the period from August 2020 to 30 June 2021. Zenit ended the season as Premier League and Super Cup champions, reached the Round of 16 in the Russian Cup and finished 4th in their UEFA Champions League Group.

Season Events
On 27 July, Zenit announced the signing of Dejan Lovren from Liverpool on a three-year contract.

On 29 July, Oleg Shatov, Igor Smolnikov and Branislav Ivanović all left Zenit after their contracts expired.

On 30 July, Artem Dzyuba signed a new two-year contract with Zenit, with the option of a third.

On 31 July, Zenit announced that Yuri Zhirkov had signed a new contract until the end of the season, whilst Mikhail Kerzhakov had signed a new one-year contract with the option of an additional year.

On 7 August, Emanuel Mammana moved to Sochi on a season-long loan deal.

On 6 October, Zenit announced the signing of Wendel from Sporting CP, on a contract until the end of the 2024/25 season, the departure of Emiliano Rigoni to Elche on a permanent deal,
 and the re-signing of Daler Kuzyayev on a contract until the summer of 2023 after his contract had expired at the end of the previous season.

On 15 October, Zenit signed Dmitri Chistyakov on loan from Rostov for the remainder of the season, with an option to make the move permanent, whilst Denis Terentyev left the club to return to Rostov on a permanent deal. 

On 19 October, the Moscow Oblast governor, Andrey Vorobyov, announced that all sporting events in the area must take place behind closed doors from 21 October until 7 November, meaning Zenits trip to Khimki on 1 November will be played without fans.

Squad

Out on loan

Transfers

In

Loans in

Out

Loans out

Released

Friendlies

Competitions

Super Cup

Premier League

League table

Results summary

Results by round

Results

Russian Cup

UEFA Champions League

Group stage

Squad statistics

Appearances and goals

|-
|colspan="14"|Players away from the club on loan:
|-
|colspan="14"|Players who left Zenit during the season:

|}

Goal scorers

Clean sheets

Disciplinary record

References

FC Zenit Saint Petersburg seasons
Zenit Saint Petersburg
Zenit Saint Petersburg
Russian football championship-winning seasons